Caterina Barbieri (born September 16, 1990) is an Italian composer and musician currently based in Milan, Italy.

Academia
Prior to and concurrently with her early music career, Caterina studied electroacoustic composition as well as classical guitar at the Conservatory of Bologna, Italy, in which she earned a bachelor's and master's degree, respectively. She has also earned a bachelor's degree from the Faculty of Humanities and Philosophy of Bologna with a thesis in Ethnomusicology about Hindustani music and minimalism.

Music career

Caterina's work explores consciousness and the psychoacoustic effects of repetition. Most of her compositions make use of modular synthesis, and she was first inspired by the Buchla 200, though she has stated she is less interested in the hardware and prefers to focus on the music itself. She is often cited as a minimalist composer and takes a no-frills approach towards composition. In 2020 she composed the soundtrack for John and the Hole, which was selected for that year's Cannes film festival.

In July 2021 she announced the launch of her independent label, light-years. In April 2022 she released the single "Broken Melody" and announced her fifth album Spirit Exit, which was released on July 8, 2022. Recorded during the first two months of the 2020 COVID-19 lockdown in Mila, the album is also the first in her solo work to feature strings, guitar, and vocals in addition to synthesizer. Critics noted that Spirit Exit was also more taut and condensed in sound compared to previous albums, owing to its development occurring in her home studio.

Discography

Studio albums

References

1990 births
Living people
Italian composers
Italian electronic musicians
Italian women musicians